A Modest Hero is a 1913 American drama film featuring Harry Carey.

Cast
 Walter Miller as The Husband
 Lillian Gish as The Wife
 Charles Hill Mailes as First Thief
 John T. Dillon as Second Thief
 Charles West as A Crook/Cleaning Man
 Alfred Paget as First Policeman
 Harry Carey

See also
 Harry Carey filmography
 Lillian Gish filmography

External links

1913 films
1913 short films
American silent short films
American black-and-white films
1913 drama films
Silent American drama films
Films directed by Dell Henderson
1910s American films